National Secondary Route 238, or just Route 238 (or ) is a National Road Route of Costa Rica, located in the Puntarenas province.

Description
In Puntarenas province the route covers Golfito canton (Golfito district), Corredores canton (Corredor, La Cuesta, Canoas, Laurel districts).

References

Highways in Costa Rica